Dunagan is a ghost town in Angelina County, in the U.S. state of Texas. It is located within the Lufkin, Texas micropolitan area.

History
Dunagan was named for a man named Isaac Dunagan and was first settled in the early 1840s (before Angelina County was established). The first commissioners' court in the county met at Dunagan's house in 1846. The community, as well as nearby Moses Bluff, were up for a vote on being the county seat after the county was established in 1846. Moses Bluff won the vote 26:2. To appease dissatisfied voters, another election was held, but this time, Moses Bluff had 39 votes, while Dunagan again only had two. For election purposes, Moses Bluff was designated as River Place for its location on the Angelina River, while Dunagan went by the name Center. It became a ghost town afterward, and only a railroad siding was in the area in the 1980s.

The Angelina and Neches River Railroad operates a line traveling  to an interchange with the Union Pacific Railroad in Lufkin.

Geography

Education
Today, the ghost town is located within the Lufkin Independent School District.

See also
List of ghost towns in Texas

References

Geography of Angelina County, Texas
Ghost towns in East Texas